Huamei-Bond International College (HBIC) is an international school in Tianhe District, Guangzhou. It provides both a Chinese curriculum and an Ontario, Canada curriculum, allowing students to earn diplomas from both systems.

References

External links
 Huamei-Bond International College
 Huamei-Bond International College 

Canadian international schools in China
International schools in Guangzhou
Tianhe District